S. M. Emdadul Hoque is a Judge of the High Court Division of Bangladesh Supreme Court.

Early life 
Hoque was born on 7 November 1963. He completed his bachelor's degree and masters in law from the University of Rajshahi.

Career 
Hoque started working as a district court lawyer on 7 October 1990.

On 26 November 1992, Hoque became a lawyer of the High Court Division of Bangladesh Supreme Court.

Hoque was appointed an additional judge of the High Court Division of Bangladesh Supreme Court on 23 August 2004. He became a permanent judge on 23 August 2006.

Hoque along with 18 other judges opposed a High Court Division judgement that ordered the government to confirm the appointment of 10 judges denied by the Bangladesh Nationalist Party government in July 2008.

On 27 August 2009, Hoque and Justice A. F. M. Abdur Rahman acquitted Member of Parliament Joynal Hazari on an arms case filed in 2001.

In December 2010, Hoque and Justice Md Ashfaqul Islam issued an order confirming that Gulshan Club would have to pay income tax to National Board of Revenue after the club filed a petition saying it did not need to file taxes as it was a non-profit organization.

Hoque and Justice S.M. Mozibur Rahman issued an order for the trial against seven Rapid Action Battalion officials to proceed in August 2016 for the Talsara Darbar Sharif robbery case.

Hoque and Justice Bhishmadev Chakraborty on 14 December 2020 squashed the convictions against all the convicts, five sentenced to death, of the 2002 Netrokona rape case.

References 

Living people
20th-century Bangladeshi lawyers
Supreme Court of Bangladesh justices
1963 births
University of Rajshahi alumni
21st-century Bangladeshi judges